The Boulder River is a  tributary of the Jefferson River in southwestern Montana in the United States.

It rises in the Rocky Mountains at the continental divide in the Beaverhead-Deerlodge National Forest in western Jefferson County. It flows east and southeast through the mountains past Boulder, then south to join the Jefferson near Cardwell.

Game fish in the river include brook, brown, and rainbow trout, and mountain whitefish. Brown trout are most prevalent in the last , near the mouth, and the other three species are more prevalent in the reach upstream of the town of Boulder. The lowermost  of the river is affected by irrigation withdrawals, and the reach below the community of Basin is affected by seepage from old mines and tailings.

See also

List of rivers of Montana
Montana Stream Access Law

References

External links
Southwestern Montana relief map
Boulder River Pictures & Information
U.S. Geological Survey stream gauge near Boulder

Rivers of Montana
Bodies of water of Jefferson County, Montana